Bertwald of Ramsbury was an 11th-century Bishop of Ramsbury and saint.

Life

Bertwald became a monk at Glastonbury Abbey and was appointed Bishop of Ramsbury in 1005. He is mostly known from the witness lists of King Cnut's charters which show he was in high favour with the Danish monarch. He died on 22 April 1045 and was buried at Glastonbury.

Notes

Citations

References

External links
 
 

Anglo-Saxon saints
Bishops of Ramsbury (ancient)
People from Glastonbury
11th-century English Roman Catholic bishops
11th-century Christian saints
1045 deaths
Year of birth unknown